Antonios Papadopoulos (born 1 February 1964) is a Greek wrestler. He competed in the men's Greco-Roman 68 kg at the 1984 Summer Olympics.

References

1964 births
Living people
Greek male sport wrestlers
Olympic wrestlers of Greece
Wrestlers at the 1984 Summer Olympics
Place of birth missing (living people)
20th-century Greek people